The 2013 Futsal Confederations Cup, which was called the Intercontinental Cup for this tournament, was held in Brazil.

Having participated in 2013 Grand Prix de Futsal, many continental championships are tired of playing another tournament, so Colombia gave up their right of hosting this tournament. Only some invitees come to Brazil.

Participating teams

Group stage

Final Stage

Honors

References

Futsal Confederations Cup
F
20132
2013 in Brazilian football
2013 in Colombian football
2013 in Chilean football
2013–14 in Croatian football